Trương Kim Hùng (born 8 December 1951) is a former Vietnamese cyclist. He competed in the individual road race event at the 1968 Summer Olympics.

References

External links
 

1951 births
Living people
Vietnamese male cyclists
Olympic cyclists of Vietnam
Cyclists at the 1968 Summer Olympics
Sportspeople from Ho Chi Minh City